Saekano: How to Raise a Boring Girlfriend is a Japanese light novel series by Fumiaki Maruto, with illustrations by Kurehito Misaki. The first light novel volume was published by Fujimi Shobo under their Fujimi Fantasia Bunko imprint on July 20, 2012. As of November 2018, thirteen volumes and two short story collections have been published. In the twelfth volume, Maruto announced that the series would end in the thirteenth volume, which was released on October 20, 2017. A spin-off light novel titled Saenai Heroine no Sodatekata: Girls Side was published in three volumes from February 2015 to June 2017. Another spin-off novel titled Saenai Heroine no Sodatekata: Memorial was published in two volumes from March 2018 to November 2019. 

A manga adaptation with art by Takeshi Moriki was serialized from January 9, 2013 to August 9, 2016 in Fujimi Shobo's shōnen manga magazine Monthly Dragon Age. It has been collected in eight tankōbon volumes between August 2013 and November 2016. It has also been published in English by Yen Press between January 2016 and December 2017.

A spin-off manga titled Saenai Heroine no Sodatekata: Egoistic-Lily with art by Niito was serialized from February 4, 2013 to May 2, 2014 in Kadokawa Shoten's seinen manga magazine Young Ace. It has been collected in three tankōbon volumes. Another spin-off manga titled Saenai Heroine no Sodatekata: Koisuru Metronome with art by Sabu Musha was serialized from August 24, 2013 to April 25, 2018 in Square Enix's seinen manga magazine Big Gangan. It has been collected in ten tankōbon volumes. A manga adaptation of Saenai Heroine no Sodatekata: Girls Side was serialized in Fujimi Shobo's Monthly Dragon Age magazine from September 9, 2016 to June 9, 2017. It has been collected in two tankōbon volumes.

Light novels

Saenai Heroine no Sodatekata

Saenai Heroine no Sodatekata FD 
Two light novels titled Saenai Heroine no Sodatekata FD (short for Fan Disc) were published featuring more side stories.

Saenai Heroine no Sodatekata: Girls Side

Saenai Heroine no Sodatekata: Memorial

Manga

How to Raise a Boring Girlfriend

|}

Saenai Heroine no Sodatekata: Egoistic-Lily

|}

Saenai Heroine no Sodatekata: Koisuru Metronome

|}

Saenai Heroine no Sodatekata: Girls Side

|}

References

Saekano: How to Raise a Boring Girlfriend
Saekano: How to Raise a Boring Girlfriend